Teagan O'Dell (born 2006) is an American competitive swimmer. At the 2022 Junior Pan Pacific Swimming Championships, she placed fourth in the 200 meter individual medley, won the b-final of the 200 meter backstroke, and placed second in the b-final of the 100 meter backstroke.

Background
O'Dell attends Santa Margarita Catholic High School in Orange County, California for high school, where she competes as part of the school swim team. Her mother competed collegiately in swimming, her father was a quarterback for the football team at San Jose State University, and her three brothers are football players.

Career

2019–2021
In 2019, at the Western Zone Age Group Swimming Championships in Oregon, O'Dell swam a personal best time of 2:18.69 in the 200 meter individual medley, which was the fastest time ever swum by a female American swimmer under 13 years of age, setting a new National Age Group record in the event for the girls 11–12 age group and breaking the former record set in 2008 by Missy Franklin. At the 2020 US Olympic Trials, held in Omaha, Nebraska in 2021 due to the COVID-19 pandemic, she was one of the youngest swimmers to compete at 14 years of age, Kayla Han was the youngest, and as one of the Wave I participants she tied for fourth-place in the b-final of the 100 meter backstroke and placed second in the b-final of the 200 meter backstroke with a 2:14.37.

Two months later, as a 14-year-old competing at the 2021 Speedo Summer Championships in Irvine, California, O'Dell swam a personal best time of 2:12.53 in the 200 meter individual medley, becoming the fastest female American swimmer ever in the event under 15 years of age, and breaking the former National Age Group record for the girls 13–14 age group of 2:12.73 set in 2009 by Missy Franklin. Earlier in the competition, she won the 200 meter backstroke with a personal best time of 2:09.57.

2022
At the 2022 USA Swimming International Team Trials, held in April in Greensboro, North Carolina, O'Dell placed eighth in the final of the 200 meter individual medley with a 2:17.62, tied for seventh in the c-final of the 100 meter freestyle with a 56.08, won the c-final of the 200 meter backstroke with a 2:12.38, placed fourth in the c-final of the 50 meter backstroke with a 28.84, and placed fifth in the c-final of the 100 meter backstroke with a 1:01.79. Based on her times and overall placings amongst junior swimmers at the trials, she was named to the 2022 Junior Pan Pacific Swimming Championships roster for the United States in the 200 meter individual medley. In May, she won California Division I State High School Championships titles for the 2021–2022 school year in the 100 yard backstroke, with a time of 52.27 seconds, and the 200 yard individual medley, with a 1:55.15. Gaining more competition experience leading up to the Championships, she competed at the senior 2022 US National Championships three months later, placing second in the c-final of the 400 meter individual medley with a 4:49.06 and won the d-final of the 200 meter freestyle with a 2:00.92.

2022 Junior Pan Pacific Championships
Day one of the 2022 Junior Pan Pacific Swimming Championships, held at the Veterans Memorial Aquatic Center in Honolulu in August, she placed second in the b-final of in the 100 meter backstroke with a time of 1:01.61. The next day, she placed 20th in the 100 meter freestyle with a time of 56.36 seconds and the third day she won the b-final of the 200 meter backstroke with a time of 2:12.80. For the final day of competition, she swam a 2:15.96 in the preliminaries of the 200 meter individual medley and qualified for the final ranking fifth. In the final, she placed fourth with a time of 2:14.45, finishing just 0.09 seconds behind fellow American and bronze medalist Gracie Weyant.

2022 Winter Junior National Championships
As a 16-year-old at the West edition of the 2022 Winter Junior US National Championships, held in December in Austin, Texas, O'Dell started off her individual events with a second-place finish in the 200 yard individual medley with a time of 1:55.61 and an eighth-place finish in the 50 yard freestyle with a time of 22.78 seconds on day two. In the finals session the following day, she placed fourth in the 200 yard freestyle with a personal best time of 1:43.94 before going on to place second in the 100 yard backstroke with a personal best time of 51.86 seconds. Day four of four, she placed second in the 200 yard backstroke with a personal best time of 1:51.00, which was 2.68 seconds behind the first-place finisher, 17-year-old Bella Sims, and 1.04 seconds ahead of the third-place finisher, fellow 16-year-old Katie Grimes, and won the 100 yard freestyle with a personal best time of 48.47 seconds, which was 0.21 seconds ahead of second-place finisher Rebecca Diaconescu and 0.29 seconds ahead of third-place finisher Claire Weinstein.

International championships

Personal best times

Long course meters (50 m pool)

Short course yards (25 yd pool)

Records

National age group records (long course meters)

Awards and honors
 Swimming World, High School Swimmer of the Year, Runner-up: 2022
 Orange County, Swimmer of the Year (girls): 2022
 United News Post, Orange County athlete of the week (girls): May 10, 2022
 Swimming World, Up & Comers: May 2021

References

2006 births
Living people
Swimmers from California
American female backstroke swimmers
American female medley swimmers
21st-century American people